The Boston Red Sox of Major League Baseball (MLB) maintain a farm system consisting of four Minor League Baseball affiliates across the United States. Additionally, the Red Sox own and operate complex-based rookie level squads playing in the Florida Complex League in Florida and the Dominican Summer League in the Dominican Republic.

Of the non-complex based teams, the Portland Sea Dogs have been a Red Sox affiliate since 2003, the Greenville Drive have been an affiliate since 2005, the Salem Red Sox have been an affiliate since 2009, and the Worcester Red Sox entered their debut season in 2021. The Worcester Red Sox succeeded the Pawtucket Red Sox, who were a Red Sox affiliate from 1970 through 2020. The Salem Red Sox are owned by Fenway Sports Group, who also own the major league club, while the other three affiliates are independently owned.

List of affiliates by season
The below tables list Red Sox affiliates for each season since the team established its first such relationship. Sections are grouped by era, based on changes in minor league classifications. Instances of the Red Sox sharing an affiliate with other MLB teams are independently counted in parenthesis, with the partner team(s) listed in an endnote.

1928–1945
Major league teams had affiliate relationships with minor league teams as early as 1920, when the Detroit Tigers, Pittsburgh Pirates, and St. Louis Cardinals each had a farm team in the Texas League. The first team that had an affiliate relationship with the Red Sox was the Salem Witches of the New England League in 1928.

Prior to 1946, Double-A was the highest level of play in the minor leagues. Additional classifications were A through D, each of which was used by the Red Sox. Class A1 was created in 1936 and existed through 1945, and was also used by the Red Sox for several seasons. One Class E league existed in 1943, but was not used by the Red Sox.

1946–1962
The minors operated with six classes (Triple-A, Double-A, and Classes A, B, C, and D) from 1946 to 1962. The Pacific Coast League (PCL) was reclassified from Triple-A to Open in 1952 due to the possibility of becoming a third major league. This arrangement ended following the 1957 season when the relocation of the National League's Dodgers and Giants to the West Coast ended any chance of the PCL being promoted.

 Open classification (used by the PCL during 1952–1957)
Sources:

1963–1989
The foundation of the minors' current structure was the result of a reorganization initiated by Major League Baseball (MLB) before the 1963 season. The reduction from six classes to four (Triple-A, Double-AA, Class A, and Rookie) was a response to the general decline of the minors throughout the 1950s and early-1960s when leagues and teams folded due to shrinking attendance caused by baseball fans' preference for staying at home to watch MLB games on television. The 1963 reorganization resulted in the Eastern and South Atlantic Leagues being elevated from Class A to Double-A, five of seven Class D circuits plus the ones in B and C upgraded to A, and the Appalachian League reclassified from D to Rookie. The only change made within the next 27 years was some Class A teams adopting "Short Season" schedules starting in 1965.

Sources:

1990–2020
Minor League Baseball operated with six classes from 1990 to 2020. The Class A level was subdivided for a second time with the creation of Class A-Advanced. The Rookie level consisted of domestic and foreign circuits. During several seasons, the Red Sox fielded two teams in the Dominican Summer League (DSL).

Sources:

For 2020, listed teams are those announced by the Red Sox prior to cancellation of the minor-league season due to the COVID-19 pandemic.

2021–present
Prior to the 2021 season, Major League Baseball reorganized Minor League Baseball; changes included ending the Class A Short Season classification, and limiting each major league team to four affiliates above the Rookie level. Additionally, the composition and names of leagues above the Rookie level were changed.

For the Red Sox' farm system:
 The Worcester Red Sox succeeded the Pawtucket Red Sox as the Triple-A affiliate.
 The Lowell Spinners, who had been a Class A Short Season team, were dropped as an affiliate.
 The Greenville Drive and Salem Red Sox swapped relative classification levels, with Greenville moving from Single-A to "High-A", and Salem moving from Class A-Advanced to "Low-A". Low-A was reclassified as Single-A in 2022.

Notes

References

External links
 Major League Baseball Prospect News: Boston Red Sox
 Baseball-Reference: Boston Red Sox League Affiliations

minor league affiliates